Sam Humphrey (born 1994) is a New Zealand-born actor from Frankston, Victoria, Australia. He is best known for playing Charles Stratton in the 2017 film The Greatest Showman.

Early life
Humphrey was born with a rare genetic disorder called acrodysplasia. As a child, he was also diagnosed with Crohn's disease, and spent much of his life in hospitals.

In an interview, he said that he had attempted suicide several times, but with support from his family, his faith and his resilience, he was able to overcome his challenges and pursue his dream of becoming an actor.

Humphrey has two siblings; his older brother is entrepreneur Josiah Humphrey, who co-founded the tech company Appster in 2011.

Humphrey attended Tawa intermediate, Wellington, New Zealand in 2006.

Humphrey is of half Asian descent.

Career
Prior to his professional debut, Humphrey appeared in numerous school productions.

Humphrey began his acting career in television, his first role on Neighbours, where he appeared on four episodes. He made his film debut in the historical drama musical film The Greatest Showman, he played Charles Stratton, a dwarf performer who is also known by his stage name of General Tom Thumb. As he was taller than the real Tom Thumb, he had to walk on his knees and his voice was digitally altered to sound deeper.

In 2017, Humphrey starred in the television film Jeremy the Dud.

Filmography

Film

Television

References

External links
 
 

Living people
Australian male film actors
Australian male television actors
Actors with dwarfism
1994 births
New Zealand emigrants to Australia
Male actors from Melbourne
People from Frankston, Victoria